Te Iki-o-te-rangi Pouwhare (1880–1963) was a New Zealand tribal leader, historian and genealogist. Of Māori descent, he identified with the Tuhoe iwi. He was born in Te Houhi, Wanganui, New Zealand in about 1880.

References

1880 births
1963 deaths
Ngāi Tūhoe people
New Zealand Māori writers
20th-century New Zealand historians
New Zealand genealogists